Kamata can refer to:

Places 
Kamata, Tokyo, a neighborhood in Ōta, Tokyo, Japan
Kamata High School, a school located in the Kamata neighborhood, Ōta, Tokyo, Japan
Kamata Kingdom, a 13th-century kingdom in Assam, India
Kamtapur, autonomous administrative division in Assam, India
Kamatapur Autonomous Council, autonomous administrative region in Assam, India
Kamata, New Zealand, a locality in Grey District, New Zealand

People with the surname 
Jiro Kamata (born 1985), Japanese footballer
Mitsuo Kamata (born 1937), Japanese footballer
Pedro Kamata (born 1981), Angolan-born Congolese-French footballer
, Japanese basketball player
Shoma Kamata (born 1989), Japanese footballer
Tor Kamata (1937–2007), American-Canadian wrestler
Yoshinao Kamata (born 1993), Japanese professional baseball pitcher

Train stations 
Kamata Station (Tokyo), an interchange train station located in Ōta in Tokyo, Japan, served by the Keihin-Tōhoku Line, Tōkyū Tamagawa Line, and Tōkyū Ikegami Line
Keikyū Kamata Station, a railway station located in Ōta in Tokyo, Japan, operated by Keihin Electric Express Railway (Keikyū)
Kamata Station (Ehime), a train station located in Ehime Prefecture, Shikoku, Japan, served by the Iyo Railway Gunchu Line

See also 
 Kamta (disambiguation)
 Kamada

Japanese-language surnames